Siehdichum is a municipality in the Oder-Spree district, in Brandenburg, Germany. The name literally means "have a look around you".

Demography

References

Localities in Oder-Spree